Ruslan Jamshidov (born 22 August 1979) is a retired Kyrgyzstani footballer who is a striker. He last played for Alga Bishkek. He was a member of the Kyrgyzstan national football team.

Career statistics

International

Statistics accurate as of match played 28 July 2011

International goals

References

External links
 
 ffkr.kg All National Team matches

1979 births
Living people
Kyrgyzstani footballers
Kyrgyzstan international footballers
Kyrgyzstani expatriate footballers
Kyrgyzstani expatriate sportspeople in Kazakhstan
FC Alga Bishkek players
Association football forwards